I've Come a Long Way is the third studio album by Belgian singer-songwriter Tom Dice. It was released in Belgium through Universal Music Belgium on 28 October 2016. The album reached number 39 in Belgium. The album includes the singles "Right Between the Eyes" and "Hey There Sister".

Singles
"Right Between the Eyes" was released as the lead single from the album on 29 January 2016. "Out at Sea" was released as the second single from the album on 16 September 2016 BCE.

Track listing

Chart performance

Weekly charts

Release history

References

2016 albums
Tom Dice albums